Montréal is one of the administrative regions of the Canadian province of Quebec.  It is also a territory equivalent to a regional county municipality (TE) and a census division (CD), for both of which its geographical code is 66. Prior to the merger of the municipalities in Region 06 in 2002, the administrative region was co-extensive with the Montreal Urban Community.

Located in the southern part of the province, the territory includes several of the islands of the Hochelaga Archipelago in the Saint Lawrence River, including the Island of Montreal, Nuns' Island (Île des Sœurs), Île Bizard, Saint Helen's Island (Île Sainte-Hélène), Île Notre-Dame, Dorval Island (Île Dorval), and several others.

The region is the second-smallest in area and most populous (2,004,265 as of the 2021 Canadian Census) of Quebec's seventeen administrative regions.

Government
The region consists of the 2002–2005 territory of the city of Montreal, and is coextensive with the Urban Agglomeration of Montreal (French: Agglomération de Montréal). Following merger of the municipalities of the agglomeration on January 1, 2002, sixteen of its municipalities were reconstituted on January 1, 2006.

The urban agglomeration is governed by the Montreal Agglomeration Council (French: Conseil d'agglomération de Montréal), which is composed of the Mayor of Montreal as the ex-officio leader, the 14 mayors of the reconstituted cities, and 15 city councillors. The executive of the council is the Montreal Executive Committee, which can be headed by the Mayor of Montreal or a councillor the mayor appoints. The weighting of votes for the council breaks down to 87% for the City of Montreal, and 13% for the other municipalities of the Island of Montreal.

Powers
The agglomeration council is granted responsibility over:
Municipal assessment
public transportation
Arterial road planning
Local water resource management
Water supply
Public safety, including law enforcement, firefighting & paramedic services.
Municipal courts
Economic development
Public housing

And any other local responsibilities under the Municipal Powers Act. However, the city of Montreal is not obligated to execute these powers, and may delegate powers to local municipalities or other governing bodies.

Powers delegated to the Montreal Metropolitan Community (CMM), the regional government of Greater Montreal, by the urban agglomeration include public housing, economic development, and water supply and water treatment. Responsibility for public transit is shared with the agglomeration directly appointing members to the RTM, the regional transportation authority, and indirectly appointing members to the ARTM, the regional public transport planning authority, via the Montreal Metropolitan Community.

Subdivisions

Cities
Baie-d'Urfé
Beaconsfield
Côte Saint-Luc
Dollard-des-Ormeaux
Dorval
Hampstead
Kirkland
L'Île-Dorval
Montreal (Montréal in French)
 Borough of Ahuntsic-Cartierville
 Borough of Anjou
 Borough of Côte-des-Neiges–Notre-Dame-de-Grâce
 Borough of L'Île-Bizard–Sainte-Geneviève
 Borough of LaSalle
 Borough of Lachine
 Borough of Le Plateau-Mont-Royal
 Borough of Le Sud-Ouest
 Borough of Mercier–Hochelaga-Maisonneuve
 Borough of Montréal-Nord
 Borough of Outremont
 Borough of Pierrefonds-Roxboro
 Borough of Rivière-des-Prairies–Pointe-aux-Trembles
 Borough of Rosemont–La Petite-Patrie
 Borough of Saint-Laurent
 Borough of Saint-Léonard
 Borough of Verdun
 Borough of Ville-Marie
 Borough of Villeray–Saint-Michel–Parc-Extension
Montréal-Est
Montreal West (Montréal-Ouest in French)
Mount Royal (Mont-Royal in French)
Pointe-Claire
Sainte-Anne-de-Bellevue
Westmount

Village
Senneville

See also
 Greater Montreal
 List of regional county municipalities and equivalent territories in Quebec

References

External links
Portail régional de Montréal (archived website)
 From the official website of the City of Montréal 
French website
English website
beta website, in English
Montréal region Statistics Canada

 
Montreal
Montreal
Montreal
Montreal